Surf Girls is a reality television show on MTV that aired from May 12, 2003 to July 7, 2003.  The show consisted of 14 amateur surfers trying to win for the chance to go professional. The show was a collaboration between MTV and Quiksilver women's brand Roxy.

The winners of the show were Jen Pollock and Mary Osbourne. Osbourne would go on later to win the 2009 and 2010 Malibu Surfing Association's annual Classic competition.

Cast

Controversy
Transword Surf reported that one of the judgesJon Rose, said despite judges voting a girl off, the show's producers reversed their decision in order to keep her in the game.

References

External links
Official Website

MTV original programming
2003 American television series debuts
2003 American television series endings
2000s American reality television series
Television series about teenagers